The 1997–98 Slovak Extraliga season was the fifth season of the Slovak Extraliga, the top level of ice hockey in Slovakia. 10 teams participated in the league, and HC Slovan Bratislava won the championship.

Standings

Playoffs

Quarterfinals
 HC Slovan Bratislava - HK VTJ Spišská Nová Ves 3:0 (8:1,8:2,6:4)
 HC Košice - Martimex ZŤS Martin 3:0 (4:2,5:1,2:0)
 ŠKP PS Poprad - HK 36 Skalica 3:0 (7:1,7:4,5:4)
 Dukla Trenčín - HKm Zvolen 3:2 (4:2,7:4,2:3 OT,1:4,4:3)

Semifinals
 HC Slovan Bratislava - Dukla Trenčín 3:0 (5:1,4:0,6:3)
 HC Košice - HC ŠKP Poprad 3:0 (6:2,3:2,3:1)

3rd place 
 HC ŠKP Poprad - Dukla Trenčín 2:0 (6:3,3:2)

Final 
 HC Slovan Bratislava - HC Košice 3:2 (3:2 OT,5:4 OT,1:2,1:4,3:2 OT)

Relegation
 HK 32 Liptovský Mikuláš - HK Spartak Dubnica nad Váhom 3:2 (2:3 OT,1:2,5:1,2:1,3:2 OT)

External links
 Slovak Ice Hockey Federation

Slovak Extraliga seasons
Slovak
Slovak